Martin Yves Angha-Lötscher (born 22 January 1994) is a Swiss footballer who plays as a centre back.

Career

Arsenal
Angha was born in Zürich.

He was with Arsenal as a youth player in their academy and reserves. Before Arsenal Angha played for FC Zürich and Grasshopper Club Zürich. Angha did admit that before signing for Arsenal there was interest from Chelsea, Manchester United, and German club Bayern Munich. After the 2011–12 season Angha made the most appearances for the Arsenal Reserves team, grabbing 22 matches while with the Reserves. On 26 September 2012, Angha made his Arsenal first-team debut against Coventry City in the League Cup.  On 4 December 2012, Angha made an appearance against Olympiacos in the Champions League, coming on as a substitute in the 83rd minute.

1. FC Nürnberg
On 10 April 2013, Angha agreed a summer move to German Bundesliga club 1. FC Nuremberg on a free transfer, signing a four-year deal.

1860 Munich
On 30 August 2014, Angha signed a three-year-contract with German 2. Bundesliga club 1860 Munich. He made his debut on 14 September 2014 in a 1-2 away win against St. Pauli, where he played the entire match as a right back.

St. Gallen
Angha signed for Swiss Super League club St. Gallen in July 2015 for a reported fee of £150,000. He was club captain during his time with the club.

Sion
On 11 September 2017, Angha signed for FC Sion on a free transfer.

Fortuna Sittard
On 26 August 2019, Fortuna announced the transfer of Angha from FC Sion for an unknown fee. He signed a two year contract with a third year option for the club.

Al-Adalah
On 20 June 2022, Angha joined newly promoted Saudi Pro League club Al-Adalah. On 16 January 2023, Angha was released from his contract.

Personal life
Angha's mother is Swiss and his father is Congolese.

Club statistics

1.Includes English FA Cup, German FA Cup, and Swiss FA Cup.
2.Includes UEFA Champions League.
3.Includes English League Cup.

References

External links

1994 births
Living people
Footballers from Zürich
Association football defenders
Swiss men's footballers
Swiss expatriate footballers
Swiss people of Democratic Republic of the Congo descent
Bundesliga players
2. Bundesliga players
Regionalliga players
Swiss Super League players
Eredivisie players
Saudi Professional League players
Grasshopper Club Zürich players
FC Zürich players
Arsenal F.C. players
1. FC Nürnberg players
TSV 1860 Munich players
Fortuna Sittard players
Al-Adalah FC players
Expatriate footballers in England
Expatriate footballers in Germany
Expatriate footballers in Saudi Arabia
Swiss expatriate sportspeople in Saudi Arabia
Switzerland under-21 international footballers
Switzerland youth international footballers